The 2016 Athletics Kenya Olympic Trials the athletics meeting held by Athletics Kenya to select the representatives to the 2016 Olympics in Rio de Janeiro, Brazil. The meet was held June 29-30, 2016 in Kipchoge Keino Stadium in Eldoret, Kenya. Eldoret is at high altitude in athletics terms.

Men's results
Key:
.

Track

Field

Women's results
Key:
.

Track

References

ATHLETICS KENYA / NOCK-K NATIONAL TRIALS FOR OLYMPIC GAMES KIPCHOGE STADIUM ELDORET Results. Global Post (2016-07-01). Retrieved on 2016-09-11.
2016 Kenyan Olympic Trials Results. Let's Run (2016-07-01). Retrieved on 2016-09-11.

Kenya World Championship Trials
Kenya World Championship Trials
Athletics competitions in Kenya
Kenyan Athletics Championships